Anchusa arvensis is a plant species of the genus Anchusa. Its common names include small bugloss and annual bugloss.

Description

This is a hairy annual herb which may reach half a meter in height. It bears small blue tubular flowers, four nutlets per flower, and one seed per nutlet. Leaves are very bristly and warty-looking, which differentiates it from similar species like Pentaglottis sempervirens and Myosotis arvensis.

Distribution and Habitat

The plant is native to Europe, and is found elsewhere.

Anchusa arvensis is found in arable field margins, sandy heaths, disturbed ground.

In the UK it is a declining species with patchy distribution, however conservation status as of 2005 is least concern.

Anchusa arvensis flowers April to September in the UK.

References

External links
Jepson Manual Treatment
Nature Spot - Bugloss
Plantlife - England's Important Arable Plants

arvensis
Flora of Europe
Plants described in 1753
Taxa named by Carl Linnaeus